The 1946 Jacksonville State Eagle Owls football team represented Jacksonville State Teachers College (now known as Jacksonville State University) as a member of the Alabama Intercollegiate Conference (AIC) during the 1946 college football season. Led by first-year head coach Don Salls, the Gamecocks compiled an overall record of 3–5–1 with a mark of 1–1–1 in conference play.

Schedule

References

Jacksonville State
Jacksonville State Gamecocks football seasons
Jacksonville State Eagle Owls football